Saray  (also Romanized as Sarāy ; also known as Saray and Sarāy) is a village in Jazireh Rural District of Ilkhchi District, Osku County, East Azerbaijan province, Iran. At the 2006 National Census, its population was 1,153 in 318 households. The following census in 2011 counted 1,079 people in 350 households. The latest census in 2016 showed a population of 927 people in 332 households; it was the largest village in its rural district.

References 

Osku County

Populated places in East Azerbaijan Province

Populated places in Osku County